von Meck is a surname. Notable people with the surname include:

 Anoeschka von Meck, Namibian author
 Karl Otto Georg von Meck, German businessman
 Nadezhda von Meck
 Nikolai von Meck (1863-1929), son of Nadezhda and Karl Otto Georg von Meck

See also
 Meck (disambiguation)